Michael Burkett may refer to:

Mike Burkett (politician) (born 1948), American attorney and politician from Idaho
Mike Burkett, popularly known as Fat Mike, punk musician
Michael Burkett (cricketer) (born 1950), South African cricketer